Gypsy Magic is a 1997 Macedonian film directed by Stole Popov. It was Macedonia's submission to the 70th Academy Awards for the Academy Award for Best Foreign Language Film, but was not accepted as a nominee.

Plot
A romantic story in gypsy family makes a last, desperate effort to find its way out of the Balkan absurdity and misfortune. Their story mirrors the universal story of the rejected and the maladjusted, the forgotten street heroes who make the news only in the obituaries or crime sections...  A romantic story about a gypsy family, living on the periphery of the Macedonian capital. It talks about their efforts through everyday life, colorfully describing their ambitions and their honest and sweet dreams (for the modern world maybe seemingly ridiculous). It is a film about the warm and always hopeful gypsy spirit and performing actual gypsy magic curses. Even though the story is placed in a rural area, it is an everywhere story, with everywhere problems and situations, some of it from every level of society. Big dreams, love, family, acceptance of diversity – are spices of this honest and touching story, which gone make you laugh, and cry, from time to time. A bed is an object of a big dream, does it's gone release? Someone dream is to be what is. Their dreams are maybe usual and boring but painfully honest.

See also
 List of submissions to the 70th Academy Awards for Best Foreign Language Film
 List of Macedonian submissions for the Academy Award for Best Foreign Language Film

References

External links

1997 films
Macedonian comedy-drama films
Macedonian-language films
Romani-language films
1997 comedy-drama films